Sphaeridium lunatum is a species of water scavenger beetle in the family Hydrophilidae. It is found in Europe and Northern Asia (excluding China) and North America.

References

Further reading

External links

 

Hydrophilidae
Articles created by Qbugbot
Beetles described in 1792